The Temple of King Dongmyeong (Hangul: 동명왕 신사, Hanja: 東明王 神祠), also known as the Temple of Jumong (Hangul: 주몽사, Hanja: 朱蒙祠), was a shamanistic temple dedicated to King Dongmyeong of Goguryeo, the founder of the Korean kingdom of Goguryeo. It existed in at least two places; one in the Liaodong Peninsula and another in the Korean Peninsula.

The temple was standing even in the medieval Goryeo dynasty; however, it has currently been lost to history.

Description 
In the Samguk Sagi (Records of the Three Kingdoms), the 'Temple of Jumong' appears in the record for the lunar May of 646 AD. According to the records, the fortress of Yodong, which safeguarded the western boundaries of Goguryeo, was threatened by an invasion from the Tang dynasty of China. The record mentions that there was a temple dedicated to Jumong, or King Dongmyeong, in Yodong Fortress. Inside the temple was a suit of chain armor and a sharp spear. The people of Yodong believed that the armor and the spear had fallen from the heavens during the 4th century.

As the battle for Yodong Fortress continued, a beautiful maiden pretended to be the wife of King Dongmyeong to please the dead king. Meanwhile, a mudang (shaman), said; "The fortress shall be safe, for Jumong is in a pleasant mood."

Thus, in Goguryeo society, King Dongmyeong was believed to embody a suit of chain armor and a sharp spear, and was prayed to during times of war. Thus, he was the holy patron of the state (much like Horus of Ancient Egypt), and an ancestor deity.

A temple of King Dongmyeong is also mentioned in the Goryeo Dogyeong, a book about the Goryeo dynasty written by a Chinese Song dynasty scholar. As the Goryeo dynasty existed within the Korean Peninsula, it can be inferred that there was at least one temple (and probably more) dedicated to King Dongmyeong within the Korean Peninsula.

References 
http://terms.naver.com/entry.nhn?docId=544262&categoryId=1627&mobile

Goguryeo
Destroyed temples
Temples in Korea
Korean shamanism